Curses is an interactive fiction computer game created by Graham Nelson in 1993. Appearing in the beginning of the non-commercial era of interactive fiction, it is considered one of the milestones of the genre.

Writing for The New York Times, Edward Rothstein described the game as "acclaimed."

Plot
The player plays the part of the current owner of Meldrew Hall. In the course of searching the attic for an old tourist map of Paris, the protagonist steps into a surreal adventure to uncover a centuries-old curse that has been placed on the Meldrew family. The goal of the game is to find the missing map, and thus annul the curse.

Development
Curses was originally developed on an Acorn Archimedes using Acorn C/C++, before Nelson moved to his Inform programming language, which was simultaneously released. It was the first non-test game developed in the language. It is distributed without charge as a Z-Code executable. The Inform source code is not publicly available.

Innovations

Curses contains some innovations that contribute to its appeal.

 Managing the player's inventory by automatically placing items in a container to make room for an object needed in hand (such as placing an item in the rucksack when reading an entry in a book), eliminating the tedium of having to manually drop one item before picking up another.
 Commands places and objects, displaying all the locations visited and all the objects seen during the game.

See also
Jigsaw (video game), another Graham Nelson game, from 1995.

References

External links
IFDB entry—the Interactive Fiction Database entry has some coverage, reviews, and links to both the original release (version 7) and the most recent one (version 16).
Baf's Guide to Interactive Fiction entry also covered the game, but the site is down since 2013.

1993 video games
1990s interactive fiction
Video games about curses
Video games about time travel
Video games based on Greek mythology
Video games developed in the United Kingdom
Single-player video games